Lirularia monodi is a species of sea snail, a marine gastropod mollusk in the family Trochidae, the top snails.

The new combination herein has been created, for consistency with the other entries for similar West African species.

Description
The height of the shell attains 3 mm.

Distribution
This species occurs in the Atlantic Ocean off Senegal and Guinea Bissau.

References

 Fischer-Piette E. & Nicklès M. 1946. Mollusques nouveaux ou peu connus des côtes de l´Afrique occidentale. Journal de Conchyliologie 87 (2): 45-82, 1 pl page(s): 48-50
 M. Nicklès (1950), Mollusques testacés marins de la côte occidentale d'Afrique, ed. Paul Lechevalier 269 p.

External links
 World Register of Marine Species

monodi
Gastropods described in 1946